The African Men's Youth Handball Championship is the official competition for youth men's national handball teams of Africa and takes place every two years. In addition to crowning the African champions, the tournament also serves as a qualifying tournament for the Youth World Championship. Egypt is the most successful national team with a record number of six titles out of 7 participants.

Summary

Medal count

Participating nations

See also
 African Men's Junior Handball Championship
 African Women's Junior Handball Championship

External links
 African Youth Handball Championship - news.abidjan.net
 

Youth
Youth handball
Men's sports competitions in Africa
Youth sport in Africa